Grease may refer to:

Common uses
 Grease (lubricant), a type of industrial lubricant
 Grease, any petroleum  or fat (including cooking fat) that is a soft solid at room temperature
 Brown grease, waste vegetable oil, animal fat, grease, etc. that is recovered from a grease trap
 Yellow grease, in rendering, used frying oils, or lower-quality grades of tallow
 Hydrogenated vegetable oil, used as a replacement for lard and other rendered animal fats
 Vegetable shortening, used as a replacement for lard and other rendered animal fats

Slang
 Grease, a euphemism, meaning, to bribe, as in "to grease someone's palm"
 Grease, a slang term for killing, as in "The mob has been known to grease anyone who gets in its way"
 Pomade, a hair styling wax

Arts, entertainment, and media

Theater
 Grease (musical), a 1971 musical play

Films
 Grease (film), 1978 film made from the musical, starring John Travolta and Olivia Newton-John 
 Grease 2, the 1982 film sequel, starring Maxwell Caulfield and Michelle Pfeiffer

Music
 "Grease" (song), the title song of the 1978 film
 Grease: The Original Soundtrack from the Motion Picture, the soundtrack album to the 1978 film
 Grease: The New Broadway Cast Recording (2007 album), the new Broadway cast recording of the musical featuring Max Crumm and Laura Osnes

Television

Series
 Grease: Live, a U.S. 2016 live TV musical that combines aspects of the 1971 musical play and 1978 film
 Grease: You're the One that I Want!, a U.S. 2007 reality TV show casting the lead roles in revivals of the musical
 Grease is the Word, a U.K. 2007 reality TV show casting the lead roles in revivals of the musical

Episodes
 "Grease", a 1997 episode of the cartoon Extreme Ghostbusters

Other uses in arts, entertainment, and media
 Grease (video game), a video game based on the 1978 film

Biology and healthcare
 Grease, or Mud fever, a disease causing irritation and dermatitis in the lower limbs of horses, most commonly in the pastern and heel area
 Grease moth (Aglossa cuprina), a fat-feeding moth

Computing 

 Grease (networking), or GREASE, a protocol ossification prevention method

See also

 
 
 Greaser (disambiguation)
 Greasy (disambiguation)
 Greece (disambiguation)

io:Graso